The 2020–21 season is 1. FC Heidenheim's 14th season in existence and the club's 7th consecutive season in the second flight of German football. In addition to the domestic league, 1. FC Heidenheim participated in this season's edition of the DFB-Pokal. The season covers the period from 7 July 2020 to 30 June 2021.

Players

Current squad

Transfers

Transfers in

Loans in

Transfers out

Loans out

Pre-season and friendlies

Competitions

Overview

2. Bundesliga

League table

Results summary

Results by round

Matches
The league fixtures were announced on 7 August 2020.

DFB-Pokal

Notes

References

External links

1. FC Heidenheim seasons
Heidenheim